Samuel Sewall Rodman III is an American Episcopal bishop. On March 4, 2017, he was elected as the 12th Bishop of the Episcopal Diocese of North Carolina, and was consecrated on July 15, 2017, by his predecessor, Presiding Bishop Michael Bruce Curry. Prior to his consecration, he was served as Special Projects Officer in the Diocese of Massachusetts. Previously, he was a parish priest.

Education 
Rodman attended public schools for 10 years, then transferred to South Kent School for his last two years of high school. In 1981, he graduated from Bates College with a B.A. in English; he later studied theology at Virginia Theological Seminary.

See also
 List of Episcopal bishops of the United States
 Historical list of the Episcopal bishops of the United States

References

Episcopal Church in Massachusetts
Bates College alumni
Virginia Theological Seminary alumni
Episcopal Church in North Carolina
South Kent School alumni
Episcopal bishops of North Carolina